"Gee" is a song recorded by South Korean girl group Girls' Generation. The original Korean-language version was released as a digital single from the extended play of the same name via SM Entertainment on January 5, 2009. The song was written, composed and arranged by Ahn Myung-won and Kim Young-deuk (who consist of the duo E-Tribe), with additional Japanese lyrics written by Kanata Nakamura. Stylistically, "Gee" is a bubblegum pop and electropop song that lyrically talks about the girls' affections when they are in love. 

Upon its release, "Gee" was a major commercial success in South Korea; it was named most popular song of the 2000s decade by Melon. It claimed the top spot on Music Bank for a record-breaking nine consecutive weeks and on Inkigayo for three weeks. It received numerous accolades at domestic award shows, including Song of the Year at the annual Melon Music Awards, Korean Music Awards and Digital Daesang at the 24th Golden Disc Awards. 

In Japan, "Gee" was recorded and released as the group's second single in the country in October 2010 in conjunction with their foray into the Japanese music scene. The single peaked at number two on the Oricon Singles Chart and number one on the RIAJ Digital Track Chart. It received a gold certification from the Recording Industry Association of Japan for exceeding physical shipments of 100,000 copies, and later earned a million certification for digital sales of over one million units. Since its initial release, "Gee" has been recognized for its influence as a modern Korean bubblegum pop standard and is regarded as one of the most iconic and influential songs in K-pop.

Background and release 
South Korean girl group Girls' Generation debuted in 2007 with their eponymous studio album, which sold over 100,000 copies and became one of the few girl groups to do so. On January 5, 2009, the group's first extended play Gee was released by SM Entertainment. The EP was commercially successful, selling over 100,000 copies in South Korea. S.M. Entertainment intended to release "Dancing Queen", a cover version of Duffy's "Mercy; the plan was scrapped nonetheless due to copyright issues, and "Gee" was thereafter released as a single to promote the EP. The song's music was composed by record producing duo E-Tribe, while its lyrics were written by Ahn Myung-won and Kim Young-deuk.

A Japanese-language version of "Gee" was released on October 20, 2010, in Japan by Nayutawave Records as Girls' Generation's second single in the country, in an attempt to broaden the group's popularity on the Japanese music scene. It was preceded by a Japanese-language version of the group's single "Genie". The lyrics were written by Kanata Nakamura. "Gee" is a bubblegum pop and electropop song with elements of techno and hip hop. The song is heavily instrumented by synthesizers. The song's lyrics talk about the girls' feelings when they are falling in love.

The music video for the Korean version of "Gee" begins with the nine members being displayed as mannequins at a clothing store and coming to life after the store's male staff (played by Minho of Shinee) leaves. The members then discover the surroundings and find out the portrait of Minho being "the employee of the month". Scenes of the members performing the choreography are juxtaposed with the storyline. At the end of the video, the members leave the store and Minho returns realizing the mannequins have disappeared. The video became the first video by a girl group to achieve over 100 million views on YouTube. Another music video for the Japanese version was also released, which also features Minho as the male staff, but does not portray the members as mannequins but Minho's fellow female staff. As of October 2020, the music video has over 260 million views on YouTube.

Reception 

Girls' Generation had their first promotional activity for the song on the MBC's music show Music Core on January 10.  "Gee" eventually became a hit, achieving nine consecutive top one on the KBS's Music Bank, and eight consecutive wins on the Mnets chart, setting a record at the time. It was named as the Song of the Decade by South Korea's online music website Melon, and chosen to be the most popular song of 2009 on Music Bank. The song has also won several major awards such as Digital Daesang and Digital Bonsang at the 24th Golden Disc Awards, the Daesang and Digital Music awards at the 19th Seoul Music Awards, and Song of the Year at the 7th Korean Music Awards.

The Japanese version sold 130,145 physical copies in 2010, becoming the 49 best-selling single of the year in Japan. The song reached number one on the RIAJ's weekly digital track chart on October 26, and eventually was ranked fifty-seventh and twenty-third on Billboard's 2010 & 2011 Japan Hot 100 charts, respectively. In January 2014, "Gee" was certified "Million" by the RIAJ, achieving more than one million digital downloads. The song is also the group's best-selling single in the US with 80,000 downloads sold as of May 2020.

In popular culture 
A parody of "Gee", called "Hee", has gained popularity among Korean citizens. It is a combination of the instrumental of "Gee" and some extremely venomous dialogue from the drama Temptation of Wife. A viral video named  was posted on YouTube on August 15, 2011, featuring elderly men in a shoe shop dancing to the Japanese version of "Gee". The video was originally on SMAPxSMAP Japanese show. It was also posted on Smosh website and was reviewed by "AtomicMari" on "Smosh Pit Weekly".

In 2009 and 2010, SM labelmates Super Junior regularly included a cover of "Gee" in their setlist for Super Show 2. The performance was preceded by a video interlude entitled The Secret of "Gee" including Jessica and Tiffany respectively dancing Heechul's and Kangin's parts in "Sorry, Sorry" during a Girls' Generation dance practice before the practice is infiltrated as a prank by Heechul, Kangin, Leeteuk and Sungmin respectively disguised as Jessica, Tiffany, Taeyeon and Sunny. "Gee" was the opening theme song of the film "To All the Boys: Always and Forever".

Legacy 

"Gee" has been widely recognized as a K-pop classic and the group's signature song. On writing the group's biography for AllMusic, Chris True selected "Gee" as one of their outstanding songs. Chuck Eddy from Spin ranked the single fifth on his list of the 21 greatest K-pop songs of all time in 2012, opining that the song has set up the group's "huge deals" ever since. Pitchfork Media editor Jakob Dorof included the song on his list of 20 essential K-pop songs in 2014, noting it for being the "magnum opus" of modern Korean bubblegum pop genre, which he regarded as K-pop's "comfort zone." He further recognized the "formally irrefutable" song as overcoming half a millennium of historical animosity to broker pop cultural peace between South Korea and Japan for only one year. Abigail Covington writing for The A.V. Club regarded Girls' Generation as the K-pop "premier, ubiquitous provider," particularly with "Gee", which helped to promote Korean music's full potential despite the fact that K-pop had existed long before the group's debut in 2007. Billboard magazine labelled "Gee" "arguably the most iconic K-pop song in the past ten years."

In 2016, "Gee" was voted the top K-pop girl group song in the past 20 years in a poll involving 2,000 people and 30 music industry experts by South Korean magazine Dong-a Ilbo, web magazine Idology and research company M Brain. In a panel of 35 music critics and industry professionals organized by Melon and newspaper Seoul Shinmun, "Gee" was ranked the fifth best idol song of all-time, crediting the song as one of the catalysts of the popularization of idol/K-pop. Music critic Jiseon Choi believed that "through the rise of 'Gee', the year 2009 was heated up and became the protagonist of a nationwide syndrome."

Accolades 

Girls' Generation received a record nine consecutive wins on Music Bank until Psy's "Gangnam Style" in 2012.

Track listing

Charts

Weekly charts

Year-end charts

Sales and certifications

Credits and personnel 
Credits adapted from album's liner notes.

Studio 
 SM Concert Hall Studio – recording, mixing, digital editing
 SM Yellow Tail Studio – recording
 Sonic Korea – mastering

Personnel 
 SM Entertainment – executive producer
 Lee Soo-man – producer
 Girls' Generation – vocals, background vocals
 E-Tribe – producer, Korean lyrics, composition, arrangement, vocal directing
 Kanata Nakamura – Japanese lyrics 
 Sugarflow – background vocals
 Go Myung-jae – guitar
 Nam Koong-jin – recording, mixing, digital editing
 Lee Seong-ho – recording
 Jeon Hoon – mastering

See also
 List of number-one digital singles of 2010 (Japan)

Notes

References

External links
 
 

2009 singles
2010 singles
Girls' Generation songs
Japanese-language songs
Korean-language songs
SM Entertainment singles
RIAJ Digital Track Chart number-one singles
Bubblegum pop songs
South Korean synth-pop songs